Sainte-Monique, Quebec may refer to:

Sainte-Monique, Centre-du-Québec, Quebec, in Nicolet-Yamaska Regional County Municipality
Sainte-Monique, Saguenay–Lac-Saint-Jean, Quebec, in Lac-Saint-Jean-Est Regional County Municipality
Sainte-Monique, Mirabel, Quebec, Mirabel, Quebec (1872-1971), now in Ville de Mirabel

See also

 Santa Monica (disambiguation)
 
 
 Monique (disambiguation)